Dilan Çiçek Deniz (born 28 February 1995) is a Turkish actress, model and beauty pageant titleholder who was crowned Miss Universe Turkey 2014 and represented her country at the Miss Universe 2014 pageant. Deniz is known for her role as Sena in Çukur, Leyla Kavak in One-Way to Tomorrow, Rüya in Alev Alev, and Elif Urazoglu in Yarım Kalan Aşklar.

Biography
She was born in 1995 in Kangals And Bards Lands Sivas. Her parents are teachers. Her mother is Hale Temizyürek and her father is Orhan Deniz. She got three years of theater education at her high school. At the age of 15 she wrote a poetry book titled Güneşi Annem Sanırdım (lit. I thought the Sun was my mother) in Turkish. When she was 17, she joined a theater competition in her school and won an acting prize. She started with a tourism major at Ege University but soon changed her major to literature.

Dilan participated in 2014 Elidor Miss Turkey beauty competition and won second place. In the 2015 Miss universe pageant that took place in Miami she represented Turkey. In 2015 she acted as 'Ebru' in youth series "Tatlı Küçük Yalancılar" which adaptation of Pretty Little Liars. In that TV show she joined Bensu Soral, Şükrü Özyıldız, Alperen Duymaz, Beste Kökdemir, Büşra Develi, and Burak Deniz.

In 2015 she also acted as 'Elif' in youth series Güneşin Kızları TV show with Hande Erçel and Tolga Sarıtaş. From August 2016 to June 2017 she played a leading role in the youth series Bodrum Masalı. In 2016 she was awarded with the shining star award at the Golden Butterfly Awards. In 2018 she appeared in a lipstick commercial for Avon Products.

From 2017 to 2019 she had one of the leading roles in the crime series Çukur, alongside Aras Bulut İynemli, Perihan Savaş, Erkan Kolçak Köstendil, Necip Memili and Rıza Kocaoğlu. In 2020, she was cast opposite Metin Akdülger in the movie One-Way to Tomorrow, which tells the story of two foreigners traveling from Ankara to İzmir.

In 2020, she starred as Elif Urazoğlu opposite Burak Deniz in the surreal series Yarım Kalan Aşklar. In the same year she was cast as one of the female leads Alev Alev alongside Demet Evgar and Hazar Ergüçlü, playing the character of Rüya Yıldırımlar.

Pageantry

Miss Turkey 2014
Dilan Cicek Deniz was crowned as Miss Universe Turkey.

Dilan Cicek Deniz competed at Miss Universe 2014 but got eliminated.

Personal life 
In January 2018, it was revealed that she was in a relationship with Turkish actor Furkan Andıç. The two broke up in November 2018.

She is currently in a relationship with Icelandic director Thor Saevarsson. On 10 December 2021, she revealed through her Instagram that they were engaged.

Filmography

Theatre

References

External links

Official Miss Turkey website

Living people
Miss Universe 2014 contestants
Turkish beauty pageant winners
People from Sivas
1995 births